Eddy Silvestre Pascual Israfilov (born 2 August 1992), or simply Eddy, is a professional footballer who plays as a defensive midfielder for Neftçi and the Azerbaijan national team.

Born in Spain to an Angolan father and an Azerbaijani mother, Eddy has represented Azerbaijan internationally since 2015.

Club career

Early life and career 
Born in Roquetas de Mar, Almería, through an Angolan father and an Azerbaijani mother, Eddy joined Milan's youth setup in 2005, aged 13, but moved to lowly La Mojonera CF two years later. At the age of 16, he spent some months in a youth detention center. In the summer of 2010, he joined Real Murcia.

Real Murcia 
Eddy made his first-team debut for Real Murcia on 8 May 2011, starting in a 2–1 home success against Jumilla CF in the Segunda División B championship; it was his maiden appearance in the competition as the Murcians were promoted at the end of the season. However, he spent several years with the B-side in Tercera División.

On 25 August 2012 Eddy played his first match as a professional, coming on as a substitute in a 3–2 win at Sporting de Gijón. On 26 January 2014 he scored his first goal, netting his side's second in a 2–2 home draw against RCD Mallorca.

Loan to Granada 
On 1 September 2014 Eddy moved to La Liga side Granada CF, in a season-long loan deal with a buyout clause. He made his debut in the competition on the 20th, replacing Rubén Rochina in the 62nd minute of a 1–0 away success over Athletic Bilbao.

Loans to Eibar and Córdoba 
On 12 July 2015, Eddy was loaned to fellow league team SD Eibar, for one year. On 1 February of the following year, after being rarely used, he moved to second-tier Córdoba CF on loan until the end of season and featured more regularly as the side made the play-offs.

Cádiz and Gimnàstic 
On 18 August 2016, Eddy signed a permanent two-year contract with Cádiz CF, newly promoted to the second division.  On 29 August of the following year, he moved to fellow league team Gimnàstic de Tarragona on a free transfer, after agreeing to a three-year deal.

Alcorcón 
On 29 January 2018, after cutting ties with Nàstic, Eddy signed a two-and-a-half-year contract with AD Alcorcón. Initially a backup option, he became a regular starter in 2018–19.

Albacete 
On 12 August 2019, Eddy agreed to a four-year deal with fellow second division side Albacete. He and 17 others left in May 2021, following the team's relegation to the Primera División RFEF.

Neftçi 
On 5 January 2022, Eddy signed for Azerbaijan Premier League champions Neftçi on a 2.5-year contract.

International career
Eddy's father, Domingo Pascual, was born in Luanda, Angola while his mother, Irada Israfilova, comes from Baku, Azerbaijan. As a result, he was eligible for these two countries, in addition to his native country of Spain.

In May 2013, Eddy was called up by Azerbaijan for a friendly match against Qatar. However, he refused to link up with the national squad, alleging club obligations.

On 8 January 2015, Azerbaijan's manager Robert Prosinečki declared that Eddy opted to represent the country. He made his debut on 28 March against Malta in a UEFA Euro 2016 qualifying match, replacing Vuqar Nadirov for the final nine minutes of a 2–0 win at the Tofiq Bahramov Stadium.

Personal life
Eddy was indicted in court over an explicit video recorded by his Eibar teammates Sergi Enrich and Antonio Luna in 2016 without the consent of the woman in the video. He was accused by the other two of diffusing the video, which he denied, and was acquitted in 2021.

Career statistics

Club

International
Statistics accurate as of match played 19 November 2019.

Notes

References

External links
 
 
 Eddy Israfilov at Granada CF

1992 births
Living people
Sportspeople from the Province of Almería
Azerbaijani footballers
Azerbaijan international footballers
Spanish footballers
Azerbaijani people of Angolan descent
Spanish people of Angolan descent
Spanish sportspeople of African descent
Spanish people of Azerbaijani descent
Association football midfielders
La Liga players
Segunda División players
Segunda División B players
Tercera División players
Real Murcia players
A.C. Milan players
Polideportivo Ejido footballers
Granada CF footballers
SD Eibar footballers
Córdoba CF players
Cádiz CF players
Gimnàstic de Tarragona footballers
AD Alcorcón footballers
Albacete Balompié players